Strokestown Road, currently known as Bishopsgate for sponsorship purposes, is the name of a football stadium in Longford, Ireland which is the home of League of Ireland club Longford Town.

History
In the mid-1990s, Longford Town moved their home ground from Abbeycartron to the townland of Mullolagher just off the N5 road between Longford and Tarmonbarry. It is one of the few League of Ireland grounds which is owned by the club itself.

The stadium underwent a huge redevelopment at the end of 2000–01 season. Previous to this, while containing a good pitch and floodlights, the ground had poor facilities along with two terraced (one uncovered) stands and a single-seater stand. The club's promotion to the Premier Division in 2000 was seen as a catalyst in the redevelopment of the ground to its present-day form. Through the receipt of government and FAI grant aid, it was fully redeveloped into an all-seater stadium by July 2001.  The ground's capacity is 5,097.

The ground became known as Flancare Park, after the club's then sponsor Flancare, in early 2001 until the arrangement finished at the end of 2013. During this time the ground held numerous international underage matches, three UEFA Cup ties and staged the 2004 League Cup final (which Longford won). It was affectionately referred to by League of Ireland fans as the Flan Siro; a play on the name of Flancare Park and on the name of the world-famous San Siro stadium in Milan, Italy.

In 2014, the ground's name changed to the City Calling Stadium. This name change was related to the club's then newly acquired main sponsor City Calling Group, a recruitment agency. 

In 2018, City Calling Stadium was honoured with the Football Association of Ireland Pitch of the Year award.

The stadium was selected as a venue for the 2019 UEFA European Under-17 Championship as part of Ireland's hosting of the tournament. Four group stage matches were held at the ground including England v France on 3 May 2019.

In November 2019, the ground was re-named Bishopsgate after the club's new main sponsor. Bishopsgate is a large contractor payroll solution for national and international companies who provide operatives into the UK market.

Location
The ground is located in the townland of Mullolagher on the Strokestown Road (N5) to the west of Longford town.

References

Association football venues in the Republic of Ireland
Longford Town F.C.
Sports venues in County Longford